History was a South Korean boy band formed by LOEN Entertainment in 2013. They debuted on April 26, 2013 with "Dreamer", featuring the narration of their labelmate IU. They were LOEN Entertainment's first boy group. They officially disbanded on May 12, 2017.

History

Pre-debut
LOEN Entertainment announced on April 12, 2013 that they would be debuting their first male idol group named "History" on 26th of that month. At the same time, they unveiled two of the group's members, Kim Si-hyoung (who had previously appeared on Ulzzang Generation Season 3) and Jang Yi-jeong (who had appeared on Birth of a Great Star 2).

Prior to their debut, Na Do-kyun had been a vocalist for the rock/ballad group Buzz under the stage name Na Yul, while Song Kyung-il had been a dancer with appearances in IU's "Beautiful Dancer" and Fiestar's "Vista" music videos, as well as performances of IU's "Cruel Fairy Tale" on SBS Inkigayo and GD TV. Kyung-il was also a part of the de facto group Nuthang (pronounced ‘new-thang’), whose members included Big Bang's G-Dragon and T.O.P among other figures.

2013: Debut with "Dreamer", Just Now, and Blue Spring
In April 2013, LOEN Entertainment released a first teaser for the group starring IU, titled "Do you know us?". A series of teaser trailers featuring the five members titled 'Real Dating Tip Book' was also released and it was announced that actress and singer Son Dam Bi would appear in the upcoming music video for the group's debut single, "Dreamer". The single was composed by Lee Min-soo and written by Kim Eana, featuring narration from IU and rap written by Sunny Hill's Misung. The group made their first live broadcast performance on Show! Music Core.

On August 20, History released the single "Tell Me Love" (produced by V.O.S's Choi Hyun-joon and composer Lim Kwang-wook, with lyrics by Eluphant's Keebee) and the mini-album Just Now.

The group's second mini-album Blue Spring was released in November of the same year, produced by Cho Young-chul and with lyrics by Kim Eana. The title track, "What Am I To You", was released on November 26 with a music video directed by Hwang Su-ah, who previously worked on IU's singles "The Red Shoes" and "Good Day" as well as Ga-In's "Bloom". Shortly after that, Yijeong featured on IU's single "Friday" from the repackage album Modern Times- Epilogue. The single was a domestic and international success, charting at number one on the Billboard K-pop Hot 100.

2014–2017: Desire, Beyond the History, Him and disbandment
On June 23, 2014, History made their comeback with the five-track EP Desire, including the title track "Psycho", composed by Lee Min-soo and East4A with lyrics by Kim Eana. Yijeong participated in writing the lyrics for the tracks "I Got U" and "Blue Moon". Longtime producer Cho Young-chul, who had previously worked on History's debut single "Dreamer" and their previous mini-albums Just Now and Blue Spring, also participated in the EP's production.

History released their fourth EP Beyond the History on May 20, 2015, along with the title track "Might Just Die".

The following year, on April 11, 2016, they released their fifth EP Him, with the title track "Queen".

The group was officially announced to be disbanding on May 12, 2017, with Kyungil enlisted in the military as part of South Korea's compulsory military service and the rest of the members required to enlist soon. All members remain signed to Loen Entertainment, but following their military service will be focusing on individual activities.

Former members
 Song Kyung-il (now is 1iL) (Hangul: 송경일) — Leader, rap, sub-vocal
 Na Do-kyun (나도균) — Main vocal
 Kim Si-hyoung (김시형) — Rap
 Kim Jae-ho (김재호) — Rap, sub-vocal
 Jang Yi-jeong (장이정) — Main vocal

Discography

Extended plays

Single albums

Singles

Awards

References

External links 
 

2013 establishments in South Korea
K-pop music groups
Kakao M artists
Musical groups established in 2013
South Korean boy bands